Samseongsan is a mountain in South Korea. It extends across the districts of Gwanak-gu and Geumcheon-gu in Seoul, the national capital, and the city of Anyang, in the province of Gyeonggi-do.

See also
 List of mountains in Seoul
 List of mountains in Korea

Mountains of Gyeonggi Province
Mountains of Seoul
Gwanak District
Anyang, Gyeonggi
Mountains of South Korea